Finsch's duck (Chenonetta finschi) was a large terrestrial species of duck formerly endemic to New Zealand. The species was possibly once the most common duck in New Zealand, a supposition based on the frequency of its fossils in bone deposits.

Taxonomy
The species was originally considered to be in its own genus, Euryanas, but is now known to be closely related to the maned duck and recently derived from that species.

Description
 
The Finsch's duck was much larger than the maned duck, probably weighing twice as much (around ) and having larger legs. The wings were much reduced however, and it seems that flight was lost relatively quickly after the species arrived in New Zealand.

Behaviour and ecology 
Little is known about the biology of the species, but its remains have been found widely in New Zealand and it does not seem to have been tied to water like many other duck species.

This species was present in forests, shrublands and temperate grasslands.

It is likely that Finsch’s duck bred in hollows, tree trunk or fallen logs because these are the preferred breeding locations of the Australian wood duck, its nearest relative.

Finsch’s duck was most likely a grazer and browser of vegetation, probably mixed with fallen fruit and some invertebrates.

Extinction
The species is thought to have become extinct due to human hunting and predation by introduced species, particularly rats. Like many large flightless New Zealand birds its remains have been found in Māori middens. Radiocarbon dating puts the youngest bones of the species as recently as the 15th -17th centuries, and one account of a large flightless goose killed in Ōpōtiki suggests the species might have survived until 1870.

References

Further reading
Tennyson, A. & Martinson, P. (2006) Extinct Birds of New Zealand Te Papa Press,Wellington 
 Finsch's Duck. Chenonetta finschi. by Paul Martinson. Artwork produced for the book Extinct Birds of New Zealand, by Alan Tennyson, Te Papa Press, Wellington, 2006

External links
Te Ara article on Finsch's Duck

Extinct flightless birds
Extinct birds of New Zealand
Chenonetta
Tadorninae
Bird extinctions since 1500
Birds described in 1930